Abronia deppii, Deppe's arboreal alligator lizard, is an endangered species of arboreal alligator lizard in the family Anguidae.  The species was described in 1828 by Arend Friedrich August Wiegmann, and it is endemic to Mexico.

Etymology
The specific name, deppii, is in honor of German naturalist Ferdinand Deppe.

Geographic range
A. deppii is found in the mountains of the Mexican states of Guerrero and Morelos.

Habitat
The preferred natural habitat of A. deppii is forest.

Description
Dorsally, A. deppii is black and white.

Reproduction
A. deppii is viviparous.

References

Further reading
Boulenger GA (1885). Catalogue of the Lizards in the British Museum (Natural History). Second Edition. Volume II. ... Anguidæ ... London: Trustees of the British Museum (Natural History). (Taylor and Francis, printers). xiii + 497 pp. + Plates I-XXIV. (Gerrhonotus deppii, pp. 269–270).
Flores-Villela O, Sánchez-Herrera O (2003). "A New Species of Abronia (Squamata: Anguidae) from the Sierra Madre del Sur of Guerrero, Mexico, with Comments on Abronia deppii ". Herpetologica 59 (4): 524–531.
Liner EA (2007). "A Checklist of the Amphibians and Reptiles of México". Occasional Papers of the Museum of Natural Science, Louisiana State University 80: 1-60. (Abronia deppii, p. 20).
Sánchez-Herrera O, López-Forment W (1980). "The lizard Abronia deppii (Sauria: Anguidae) in the state of México, with the restriction of its type locality". Bulletin of the Maryland Herpetological Society 16 (3): 83–87.
Schmidt-Ballardo W, Solano-Zavaleta I, Clause AG (2015). "Abronia deppii. Reproduction". Mesoamerican Herpetology 2 (2): 192–194.
Wiegmann AF (1828). "Beiträge zur Amphibienkunde ". Isis von Oken 21 (4): 364–383. (Gerrhonotus deppii, new species, pp. 379–380). (in Latin).
Wiegmann AFA (1834). Herpetologia Mexicana, seu descriptio amphibiorum Novae Hispaniae, quae itineribus comitis de Sack, Ferdinandi Deppe et Chr. Guil. Schiede in Museum Zoologicum Berolinense pervenerunt. Pars prima, saurorum species amplectens. Adiecto systematis saurorum prodromo, additisque multis in hunc amphibiorum ordinem observationibus. Berlin: C.G. Lüderitz. vi + 54 pp. + Plates I-X. (Gerrhonotus deppii, pp. 31–32 + Plate IX, figures 3 & 4). (in Latin).

Abronia
Reptiles described in 1828